The 1872 Pontefract by-election was fought on 15 August 1872.  The ministerial by-election was fought due to the incumbent Liberal MP, Hugh Childers, becoming Chancellor of the Duchy of Lancaster and Paymaster General.  It was retained by Childers.

It was the first UK Parliamentary election that was held by secret ballot held shortly after the Ballot Act of 1872 ended the old practice of open voting had come into effect.  There was considerable interest in the outcome, many observers believing that support for the rival politicians might be drastically different as voters were able to make their choice in secret. However, the election results were reflective of the political preference of the constituency prior to the Ballot Act. One of the main arguments made in support of voting by ballot was that it would put a stop to the riots and disorders so prevalent at previous elections. The Pontefract election conclusively proved that secret voting reduced riotous behaviour. Hugh Childers was re-elected on 15 August 1872 following his appointment as Chancellor of the Duchy of Lancaster.

The Pontefract museum holds the original ballot box, sealed in wax with a Pontefract cake liquorice stamp.

Results

References

1872 elections in the United Kingdom
1872 in England
19th century in Yorkshire
August 1872 events
Pontefract
Elections in Wakefield
By-elections to the Parliament of the United Kingdom in West Yorkshire constituencies
Ministerial by-elections to the Parliament of the United Kingdom